Hans van Walsem (14 December 1916 – 2 January 1943) was a Dutch rower. He competed in the men's coxed pair event at the 1936 Summer Olympics. He was killed in the Neuengamme concentration camp during World War II.

References

External links
 

1916 births
1943 deaths
Dutch male rowers
Olympic rowers of the Netherlands
Rowers at the 1936 Summer Olympics
Dutch people who died in Nazi concentration camps
Dutch Jews who died in the Holocaust
People who died in Neuengamme concentration camp
Dutch civilians killed in World War II
Sportspeople from Jakarta
Dutch people of the Dutch East Indies